Three Kingdoms: Fate of the Dragon (or simply Fate of the Dragon for short in the U.S. version) is a video game developed by Overmax Studios in 2001 for the PC. It is based on the historical background of the epic 14th century novel Romance of the Three Kingdoms by Luo Guanzhong.

As one of the three Warlords of the Kingdoms, in 184 AD China, the player must build their own kingdom, develop new technologies and create mighty armies to conquer the other Warlords and ultimately take control of the Three Kingdoms and reunify China.

Fate of the Dragon is a real-time strategy game very similar in format to that of the Age of Empires series, developed by Ensemble Studios, in which the user takes on the role of a character, namely Liu Bei, Sun Quan and Cao Cao from one of the Three Kingdoms and controls their kingdom through such means as pointing and clicking on certain parts of the map to decide what to do. The player is tasked with collecting various resources and building a standing army in order to protect their borders and defeat the other kingdoms in the game.

Reception

The game received "average" reviews according to the review aggregation website Metacritic. Lee Cummings of NextGen said of the game, "If you're a veteran RTS gamer looking for something new, this is certainly worth a look."

See also
 Dynasty Warriors
 Romance of the Three Kingdoms
 Dragon Throne: Battle of Red Cliffs
 Metal Knight

References

External links

2001 video games
Cancelled PlayStation (console) games
Eidos Interactive games
Multiplayer online games
Real-time strategy video games
Video games based on Romance of the Three Kingdoms
Video games developed in China
Video games with expansion packs
Windows games
Windows-only games